The Brilon Plateau is a highland area in the county of Hochsauerlandkreis in the German state of North Rhine-Westphalia.

Geography

Location 
The countryside of the Brilon  Plateau and  Brilon  Heights includes the town of Brilon itself and several of its municipalities. Administratively it belongs largely to Hochsauerlandkreis, in the northeast, near Bleiwäsche, it is part of the county of Paderborn. It is roughly elliptical in shape; its longitudinal axis running from east-northeast to west-southwest.

To the north and northeast it transitions via the Alme Uplands into the Sintfeld. In the east and southeast it descends into the very deeply incised valley of the Hoppecke. In the south it is adjoined by the Sauerland and Upland (landscapes in the  Rothaar Mountains); in the west by the Warstein Forest (the eastern part of the Arnsberg Forest Nature Park) and in the northwest by the narrow Haarstrang. In the north the terrain descends (on the far side of Sintfeld and Haarstrang) more or less gently into the Westphalian Bight towards the River Lippe. The plateau forms an island of farmland in the middle of forested mountains and hills.

Mountains and hills 
The mountains and hills of the Brilon Heights include the following (sorted by height in metres (m) above sea level (NHN):
 Borberg (670.2 m) – southwest of Brilon
 Bilstein (620.1 m) – northwest of Hoppecke
 Eisenberg (606.2 m) – südwest of Brilon
 Poppenberg (605.0 m) – south of Brilon
 Weiße Frau (562.5 m) – east of Rösenbeck
 Heimberg (536.4 m) – east of Brilon
 Totenkopf (502.6 m) – west of Marsberg
 Schaaken (500 m) – east-northeast of Brilon
 Schälhorn (499.1 m) – east of Scharfenberg
 Bulstern (482.3 m) – west of Wülfte
 Schweinskopf (481.4 m) – east-southeast of Bleiwäsche
 Schellberg (472 m)

Literature

Footnotes and references 

Central Uplands
Mountain ranges of North Rhine-Westphalia
Hochsauerlandkreis